Abel Octavio Salgado Peña (born 4 September 1971) is a Mexican politician affiliated with the PRI.  he served as Deputy of the LXII Legislature of the Mexican Congress representing Jalisco.

References

1971 births
Living people
Politicians from Jalisco
Institutional Revolutionary Party politicians
21st-century Mexican politicians
Deputies of the LXII Legislature of Mexico
Members of the Chamber of Deputies (Mexico) for Jalisco